Pyr was the science fiction and fantasy imprint of Prometheus Books, launched in March 2005 with the publication of John Meaney's Paradox. In November 2018 it was sold to Start Publishing.

Prometheus Books' name was derived from Prometheus, the Titan from Greek mythology who gave fire to humans. The name Pyr, the Greek word for fire, was chosen to continue this connection to fire and the liveliness of imagination.

Lou Anders served as Pyr's editorial director from its inception until 2014.

Authors published 

 Joe Abercrombie
 Fiona Avery
 Michael Blumlein
 Keith Brooke
 Storm Constantine
 Jack Dann
 Gardner Dozois
 David Louis Edelman
 Charles Coleman Finlay
 Alan Dean Foster
 Mark Hodder
 K. V. Johansen
 Kay Kenyon
 Alexis Glynn Latner
 Scott Mackay
 Ian McDonald
 John Meaney
 Michael Moorcock
 Mike Resnick
 Chris Roberson
 Adam Roberts
 Justina Robson
 Joel Shepherd
 Robert Silverberg
 Martin Sketchley
 Adrian Tchaikovsky
 David Walton
 Sean Williams
 George Zebrowski

Awards and nominations
 2011 John W. Campbell Memorial Award for Best Science Fiction Novel winner: Ian McDonald The Dervish House
 2011 Hugo Award for Best Novel nominee: Ian McDonald The Dervish House
 2011 Arthur C. Clarke Award nominee: Ian McDonald The Dervish House
 2011 Locus Award for Best Science Fiction Novel nominee: Ian McDonald The Dervish House
 2010 Philip K. Dick Award: Mark Hodder The Strange Affair of Spring Heeled Jack
 2010 British Science Fiction Award for Best Novel winner: Ian McDonald The Dervish House
 2010 British Science Fiction Award for Best Novel nominee: Ken MacLeod The Restoration Game
 2010 John W. Campbell Memorial Award for Best Science Fiction Novel nominee: Paul J. McAuley Gardens of the Sun
 2010 World Fantasy Award for Best Novel nominee: James Enge Blood of Ambrose
 2009 Chesley Award for Best Art Director: Lou Anders
 2009 Philip K. Dick Award nominee: Ian McDonald Cyberabad Days
 2009 Arthur C. Clarke Award nominee: Paul J. McAuley The Quiet War
 2008 Hugo Award for Best Novel nominee: Ian McDonald Brasyl
 2008 Nebula Award for Best Novel nominee: Ian McDonald Brasyl
 2008 John W. Campbell Memorial Award for Best Science Fiction Novel nominee: Ian McDonald Brasyl
 2008 Locus Award for Best Science Fiction Novel nominee: Ian McDonald Brasyl
 2008 Hugo Award for Best Editor Long Form, nominee: Lou Anders
 2008 John W. Campbell Award for Best New Writer nominee: Joe Abercrombie
 2008 John W. Campbell Award for Best New Writer nominee: David Louis Edelman
 2008 Philip K. Dick Award nominee: Lou Anders Fast Forward 2
 2007 British Science Fiction Award for Best Novel winner: Ian McDonald Brasyl
 2007 Philip K. Dick Award nominee: Adam Roberts Gradisil
 2007 Arthur C. Clarke Award nominee: Adam Roberts Gradisil
 2007 Quill Award nominee: Ian McDonald, Brasyl
 2007 Hugo Award for Best Editor Long Form nominee: Lou Anders
 2007 Chesley Award for Best Art Director nominee: Lou Anders
 2006 World Fantasy Award - Special Award, Professional nominee: Lou Anders
 2006 John W. Campbell Memorial Award for Best Novel nominee: David Louis Edelman, Infoquake
 2006 Independent Publisher Book Award winner: John Meaney, Paradox
 2005 Philip K Dick Award nominee: Justina Robson, Silver Screen
 2006 John W. Campbell Award for Best New Writer nominee: Chris Roberson
 2005 John W. Campbell Award for Best New Writer nominee: Chris Roberson
 2005 World Fantasy Award - Best Artist, for Pyr covers nominee: Jeremy Caniglia

Further recommendations and endorsements 

 Kay Kenyon, Bright of the Sky - selected as one of PW's Best Books of the Year for 2007.
 Ian McDonald, Brasyl - selected as the number two title in Amazon's Best Books of 2007 - Top 10 Editors' Picks: Science Fiction & Fantasy for 2007.
 Ian McDonald, Brasyl  - selected as one of Amazon's Best of the Year, So Far: Hidden Gems for 2007.
 Locus magazine Recommended Reading: 2006 : Joe Abercrombie - The Blade Itself, Justina Robson - Keeping It Real
 Pyr Books included in the B&N Editor's Choice: Top Ten SF&F Novels of 2006: David Louis Edelman - Infoquake (#1), Sean Williams - The Crooked Letter, John Meaney - Resolution
 2 Pyr Books included in Waterstone's Top Ten SF for 2006: Joel Shepherd - Crossover, Chris Roberson - Paragaea: A Planetary Romance
 3 Pyr Books included in Bookgasm's Top Five SciFi Books of 2006 - Ian McDonald - River of Gods (#1), Joel Shepherd - Crossover, David Louis Edelman - Infoquake
 Sean Williams, The Hanging Mountains selected as a BookSense Notable Book for July
 Kay Kenyon, Bright of the Sky - one of four novels selected by ReaderCon "the con that assigns homework" for their attendees to read pre-convention
 Justina Robson, Silver Screen selected for Kirkus Reviews Best SF&F Books of 2005
 John Meaney, Paradox - #2 on Barnes & Noble's Editor's Choice: Top Ten SF&F Novels of 2005

References

External links 
 PYR website
 Prometheus Books  – Official website
 Pyromania - the Pyr blog
 WWEnd Publisher Profile for Pyr

American speculative fiction publishers
Book publishing companies based in New York (state)
Science fiction publishers
Prometheus Books
Publishing companies established in 2005